Bulla cake, usually referred to as bulla, is a rich Jamaican cake made with molasses and spiced with ginger and nutmeg, sometimes dark-colored and other times light-colored. Bulla are small loaves that are flat and round. They are inexpensive and easy to make using molasses, flour and baking soda. Bulla is traditionally a popular treat for schoolchildren. It is usually eaten with cheese, butter or avocado.

A traditional food of Jamaica, the bulla cake has been used as an emblem and symbol related to development on the island nation. Former solicitor general of Jamaica, Kenneth Rattray, was a fan of bulla.

See also

Caribbean cuisine
Coco bread
Hard dough bread
Jamaican patty
List of Jamaican dishes

References

Jamaican cuisine
Cakes
Ginger dishes
Sweet breads
Molasses